MV 1st Lt. Alex Bonnyman (AK-3003), (former MV Emilie Mærsk), was the fourth ship of the  built in 1980. The ship is named after First Lieutenant Alexander Bonnyman Jr., an American Marine who was awarded the Medal of Honor during World War II.

Construction and commissioning 
The ship was built in 1980 at the Odense Staalskibsvaerft A/S, Lindø, Denmark. She was put into the service of Maersk Line as Emilie Mærsk.

In 1984, she was acquired and chartered by the Navy under a long-term contract as MV 1st Lt. Alex Bonnyman (AK-3003). The ship underwent conversion at the Bethlehem Steel at Sparrows Point, Massachusetts. She was assigned to Maritime Prepositioning Ship Squadron 3 and supported the US Marine Corps Expeditionary Brigade.

In 2009, the ship was struck from the Naval Register and later in August she was sold for scrap.

Awards 

 National Defense Service Medal

References

Cpl. Louis J. Hauge Jr.-class cargo ship
1979 ships
Ships built in Denmark
Gulf War ships of the United States
Merchant ships of the United States
Cargo ships of the United States Navy
Container ships of the United States Navy